The 2009 CONCACAF U17 Championship was the football championship tournament for under-17 in the CONCACAF region (North America, Central America and the Caribbean), and was formatted to determine the four CONCACAF representatives to advance to the 2009 FIFA U-17 World Cup in Nigeria. The 8-team tournament was originally scheduled to be played from April 21 to May 2 and hosted by Mexico at the Estadio Caliente in Tijuana. However, the tournament was cancelled on April 27 due to the swine flu outbreak in Mexico. At the time that the tournament was cancelled the group stage had already been played, and the four teams who could qualify to the U-17 World Cup – Costa Rica, Honduras, Mexico, and the United States – had already done so.

Squads

Teams

Venues

Group stage
The groups were drawn at the CONCACAF headquarters on January 15, 2009. The match schedule for the groups and final rounds were announced two weeks later. The top two teams from each group will advance to the semifinals.

Group A

Group B

Championship round
The four teams to qualify for the semifinals were automatically qualified to the World Cup. The championship round, however, was not played because it was cancelled due to a swine flu outbreak. The four qualifiers are:
 
 
 
  United States

Goal scorers

 5 goals
  Jack McInerney
 4 goals
  Anthony Lozano
 3 goals
  Martín Galván
 2 goals
  Joel Campbell
  Yaudel Lahera Garcia
  Kristian Álvarez
  Carlos Campos
  Sebastian Lletget

 2 goals (continued)
  Nicholas Palodichuk
 1 goal
  Jaineil Hoilett
  Coulton Jackson
  Justin Maheu
  Russell Teibert
  Juan Bustos
  Rosbin Mayorga
  Marvin Ceballos
  Kendel Herrate
  Gerson Lima
  Gabriel Navas

 1 goal (continued)
  Nestor Nahum Martínez
  Johny Rivera
  José Danilo Tobías
  Víctor Mañon
  Salvador Jasso
  Luis Télles
  Luis Gil
  Joseph Gyau
  Stefan Jerome
 Own goal
  Adrian Mora (for Mexico)

See also
 CONCACAF Under-17 Championship
 FIFA U-17 World Cup

References

External links
 Official CONCACAF Under 17 Tournament page
 2009 CONCACAF U-17 Championship results at official CONCACAF page

 
2009
U-17
2009
2008–09 in Costa Rican football
2008–09 in Mexican football
2008–09 in Honduran football
2009 in Cuban sport
2008–09 in Guatemalan football
2009 in Canadian soccer
2009 in American soccer
2009 in Trinidad and Tobago football
2009 in youth association football